The Battle of Loch Ryan was a battle fought on 9/10 February 1307 during the Scottish Wars of Independence near Stranraer on Loch Ryan, Galloway, Scotland.

King Robert I of Scotland's invasion of his ancestral lands in Annandale and Carrick began in 1307. The Annandale and Galloway invasion force was led by his brothers Alexander Bruce and Thomas Bruce, Malcolm McQuillan, Lord of Kintyre, an Irish sub king and Sir Reginald Crawford. The force consisted of 1000 men and eighteen galleys. They sailed into Loch Ryan and landed near Stranraer. The invasion force was quickly overwhelmed by local forces, led by Dungal MacDowall, who was a supporter of the Balliols, Comyns and King Edward I of England, and only two galleys escaped. All the leaders were captured. Dungal MacDowall, summarily executed the Irish sub king and Malcolm McQuillan, Lord of Kintyre. Alexander, Thomas and Reginald Crawford were sent to Carlisle, England, where they were executed. The heads of McQuillan and two Irish chiefs were sent to King Edward I.

References
Barbour, John, The Bruce, trans. A. A. H. Douglas, 1964.
Sir Herbert Maxwell, The Chronicle of Lanercost, 1272-1346: translated with notes (1913).

Battles of the Wars of Scottish Independence
History of Dumfries and Galloway
1307 in Scotland
Conflicts in 1307
Battles between England and Scotland